Lamium galeobdolon, commonly known as yellow archangel, artillery plant, aluminium plant, or yellow weasel-snout, is a widespread wildflower in Europe, and has been introduced elsewhere as a garden plant. It displays the zygomorphic flower morphology, opposite leaves, and square stems typical of the mint family, Lamiaceae. The flowers are soft yellow and borne in axial clusters, with a prominent 'hood' (the dorsal lobe of the corolla). It spreads easily and so has been commonly used as an ornamental ground cover. It can be invasive in places where it is not native and caution must be taken when planting in these areas.

Description
The paired opposite leaves are stalked, broadly ovate with a cordate base and toothed margin. The underside of the leaves is often purplish. The flowers grow in whorls in a terminal spike. The calyx is five-lobed. The upper lip is hooded and the lower lip has three similar-sized lobes with the central one being triangular and often streaked with orange. There are two short stamens and two long ones. The carpels are fused and the fruit is a four-chambered schizocarp.

Taxonomy
There are a number of closely related taxa which hybridize with L. galeobdolon and in some cases are not unequivocally accepted as distinct species but considered subspecies or varieties by many authors. Most well known among these is variegated yellow archangel (subsp. argentatum), whose leaves often have variegation, showing as silver patches arranged as a wide semicircle. This, and in particular its large-flowered and even stronger-marked cultivar 'Variegatum', is the taxon most often met with as a garden escapee.

Distribution
It is native to Europe, and found through Europe and Western Asia.

An introduced species in the United States, Washington state has declared it a "noxious weed" and banned its sale.

Subspecies
 Lamium galeobdolon subsp. argentatum
 Lamium galeobdolon subsp. endtmanii
 Lamium galeobdolon subsp. flavidum
 Lamium galeobdolon subsp. galeobdolon
 Lamium galeobdolon subsp. montanum

Gallery

References 

galeobdolon
Garden plants
Flora of Europe
Flora of Serbia
Flora of Asia
Plants described in 1753
Taxa named by Carl Linnaeus